This is a list of municipalities in Spain which have standing links to local communities in other countries known as "town twinning" (usually in Europe) or "sister cities" (usually in the rest of the world).

A
Adeje

 Caracas, Venezuela
 Unterhaching, Germany

Albacete

 Bir Gandus, Western Sahara
 Houndé, Burkina Faso
 La Lisa (Havana), Cuba
 Nanchang, China
 San Carlos, Nicaragua
 Reconquista, Argentina
 Udine, Italy
 Velenje, Slovenia
 Vienne, France

Albuñol

 Asilah, Morocco
 Al Hoceima, Morocco
 Ifrane, Morocco

Alcalá de Guadaíra

 Durham, England, United Kingdom
 Questembert, France
 Stuhr, Germany

Alcalá del Río
 Artena, Italy

Alcobendas
 Épinay-sur-Seine, France

Algemesí

 Basnéré, Burkina Faso
 Chiari, Italy
 Gangneung, South Korea
 Riom, France

Alicante

 Alexandria, Egypt
 Brighton and Hove, England, United Kingdom
 Carloforte, Italy
 Herzliya, Israel
 León, Nicaragua
 Nice, France
 Oran, Algeria
 Wenzhou, China

Aller
 Gembloux, Belgium

Almansa

 Lymington, England, United Kingdom
 Saint-Médard-en-Jalles, France
 Scandiano, Italy
 Volvera, Italy

Almendralejo

 Ceprano, Italy
 A Rúa, Spain

Almuñécar

 Cerveteri, Italy
 Fürstenfeldbruck, Germany
 Hendersonville, United States
 Kelibia, Tunisia
 Livry-Gargan, France

Altea is a member of the Douzelage, a town twinning association of towns across the European Union. Asikkala also has one other twin town.

Douzelage
 Agros, Cyprus
 Asikkala, Finland
 Bad Kötzting, Germany
 Bellagio, Italy
 Bundoran, Ireland
 Chojna, Poland
 Granville, France
 Holstebro, Denmark
 Houffalize, Belgium
 Judenburg, Austria
 Kőszeg, Hungary
 Marsaskala, Malta
 Meerssen, Netherlands
 Niederanven, Luxembourg
 Oxelösund, Sweden
 Preveza, Greece
 Rokiškis, Lithuania
 Rovinj, Croatia
 Sesimbra, Portugal
 Sherborne, England, United Kingdom
 Sigulda, Latvia
 Siret, Romania
 Škofja Loka, Slovenia
 Sušice, Czech Republic
 Tryavna, Bulgaria
 Türi, Estonia
 Zvolen, Slovakia
Other
 Aurillac, France

L'Ametlla de Mar

 Patuca, Honduras
 Villeneuve-de-la-Raho, France

Antequera

 Agde, France
 Melilla, Spain
 Oaxaca de Juárez, Mexico

Aranda de Duero

 Langen, Germany
 Miranda do Douro, Portugal
 Romorantin-Lanthenay, France
 Roseburg, United States
 Salon-de-Provence, France
 Santa Cruz de Tenerife, Spain

Aranjuez

 Écija, Spain
 Le Pecq, France

Archena
 Chesham, England, United Kingdom

Ávila

 Guanajuato, Mexico
 Rhodes, Greece
 Rueil-Malmaison, France
 Teramo, Italy
 Villeneuve-sur-Lot, France

Avilés

 Saint-Nazaire, France
 St. Augustine, United States

B
Badajoz

 Caldas da Rainha, Portugal
 Chipiona, Spain
 Elvas, Portugal
 Granada, Nicaragua
 Huánuco, Peru
 Nazaré, Portugal
 Punta Umbría, Spain
 San José de las Lajas, Cuba
 Santarém, Portugal

Balmaseda

 Balmaceda (Coyhaique), Chile
 San Severino Marche, Italy
 Tifariti, Western Sahara

Barañain

 Caimito, Cuba
 Mława, Poland

Barcelona

 Antwerp, Belgium
 Athens, Greece
 Boston, United States
 Busan, South Korea
 Cologne, Germany
 Dublin, Ireland
 Gaza City, Palestine
 Havana, Cuba
 Istanbul, Turkey
 Kobe, Japan
 Monterrey, Mexico
 Montevideo, Uruguay
 Montpellier, France
 Rio de Janeiro, Brazil
 Saint Petersburg, Russia
 San Francisco, United States
 Sarajevo, Bosnia and Herzegovina
 São Paulo, Brazil
 Shanghai, China

 Tunis, Tunisia
 Valparaíso, Chile

Bilbao

 Bordeaux, France
 Buenos Aires, Argentina
 Medellín, Colombia
 Monterrey, Mexico
 Pittsburgh, United States
 Qingdao, China
 Rosario, Argentina
 Sant Adrià de Besòs, Spain
 Tbilisi, Georgia

Boadilla del Monte
 Saint-Cloud, France

Borriana/Burriana
 Taverny, France

Burgos

 Loudun, France
 Pessac, France

C
Cáceres

 Blois, France
 La Roche-sur-Yon, France

Cádiz

 Ambalema, Colombia
 Bogotá, Colombia
 Brest, France
 Buenos Aires, Argentina
 Cartagena, Colombia
 Ceuta, Spain
 A Coruña, Spain
 Dakhla, Western Sahara
 Guaduas, Colombia
 Havana, Cuba
 Honda, Colombia
 Huelva, Spain
 Medway, England, United Kingdom 
 Mexico City, Mexico
 Montevideo, Uruguay
 Móstoles, Spain

 Quito, Ecuador
 San Pedro Cholula, Mexico
 San Juan, Puerto Rico
 San Sebastián de Mariquita, Colombia
 Santa Cruz de Tenerife, Spain
 Santos, Brazil
 Tangier, Morocco
 Torrevieja, Spain
 Veracruz, Mexico

Calatayud

 Auch, France
 Dueville, Italy
 Gáldar, Spain
 Glen Ellyn, United States

Cambados
 Celorico de Basto, Portugal

Canyelles
 Castelvecchio Subequo, Italy

Carcaixent

 Bagnols-sur-Cèze, France
 Braunfels, Germany
 Eeklo, Belgium
 Feltre, Italy

 Newbury, England, United Kingdom

Cartaya
 Loulé, Portugal

Caspe

 Gaillac, France
 Santa Maria a Vico, Italy

Castellón de la Plana

 Châtellerault, France
 Târgoviște, Romania
 Ube, Japan

Catarroja
 Vara, Sweden

Ceutí
 Saint-Berthevin, France

Ciudad Real

 San Cristóbal de las Casas, Mexico
 Târgoviște, Romania

Collado Villalba
 Bègles, France

Coria del Río
 Sendai, Japan

Córdoba

 Bukhara, Uzbekistan
 Córdoba, Argentina
 Córdoba, Mexico
 Damascus, Syria
 Fez, Morocco
 Kairouan, Tunisia
 Lahore, Pakistan
 Nîmes, France
 Nuremberg, Germany
 Old Havana (Havana), Cuba
 Santiago de Compostela, Spain
 Smara, Western Sahara

Cornellà de Llobregat

 Jinotega, Nicaragua
 Mariel, Cuba

Los Corrales de Buelna
 La Haie-Fouassière, France

Coslada

 Bouaké, Ivory Coast
 Jenin, Palestine
 Nejapa, El Salvador
 Oradea, Romania
 San José de las Lajas, Cuba

Crevillent
 Fontenay-le-Comte, France

Cuenca

 L'Aquila, Italy
 Bollène, France
 Cerreto Sannita, Italy
 Cuenca, Ecuador
 Paju, South Korea
 Plasencia, Spain
 Ronda, Spain
 Taxco de Alarcón, Mexico
 Zacatecas, Mexico

Cuevas del Almanzora
 Saintes, France

D
Dénia
 Cholet, France

Dos Hermanas

 Granada, Nicaragua
 Pinar del Río, Cuba

E
Écija

 Aranjuez, Spain
 Les Pavillons-sous-Bois, France
 Smara, Western Sahara

Elche
 Toulouse, France

L'Eliana

 Mirande, France
 San Mauro Torinese, Italy

Espartinas

 Clackmannanshire, Scotland, United Kingdom
 Silves, Portugal
 Vendargues, France

Esplugues de Llobregat
 Ahrensburg, Germany

Estepa
 Badia Polesine, Italy

F
Figueres

 Alcalá la Real, Spain
 Marignane, France
 St. Petersburg, United States

G
Gijón

 Havana, Cuba
 Niort, France
 Novorossiysk, Russia
 Puerto Vallarta, Mexico
 Smara, Western Sahara

Girona

 Albi, France
 Bluefields, Nicaragua
 Farsia, Western Sahara
 Reggio Emilia, Italy

Godella

 Bailly, France
 Lanuvio, Italy
 Noisy-le-Roi, France

Granada

 Aix-en-Provence, France
 Belo Horizonte, Brazil

 Freiburg im Breisgau, Germany
 Marrakesh, Morocco
 Tétouan, Morocco
 Tlemcen, Algeria

Guadalajara

 Buga, Colombia
 Guadalajara, Mexico
 Livorno, Italy
 Nuneaton and Bedworth, England, United Kingdom
 Roanne, France

H
L'Hospitalet de Llobregat

 Centro Habana (Havana), Cuba
 Managua, Nicaragua
 Tuzla, Bosnia and Herzegovina

Huelva

 Borgomezzavalle, Italy
 Cádiz, Spain
 Faro, Portugal
 Houston, United States

Huesca
 Tarbes, France

Huéscar
 Kolding, Denmark

I
Igualada

 Aksakovo, Bulgaria
 Guimarães, Portugal
 Montluçon, France
 Lecco, Italy

J
Jerez de la Frontera

 Arles, France
 Biarritz, France

 Ciudad Juárez, Mexico
 El Paso, United States
 Foz do Iguaçu, Brazil
 Kiyosu, Japan
 Moquegua, Peru
 Pisco, Peru
 Tequila, Mexico
 Zacatecas, Mexico

L
Lalín

 Cabeceiras de Basto, Portugal
 Lalinde, France
 Linden, Germany
 Linden (Cuijk), Netherlands
 Lubbeek, Belgium
 Sankt Georgen am Walde, Austria

Laudio/Llodio

 Bou Craa, Western Sahara
 Somoto, Nicaragua

Leganés

 Aigaleo, Greece
 Arroyo Naranjo (Havana), Cuba
 Conchalí, Chile
 La Güera, Western Sahara
 Macará, Ecuador
 Papel Pampa, Bolivia
 Somoto, Nicaragua

León

 Bragança, Portugal
 Chartres, France
 León, Mexico
 Matanzas, Cuba
 Porto, Portugal
 Voronezh, Russia

Lleida

 Ferrara, Italy
 Foix, France
 Lérida, Colombia
 Monterey, United States
 Perpignan, France

Logroño

 Brescia, Italy
 Darmstadt, Germany
 Dax, France
 Dunfermline, Scotland, United Kingdom
 El Hagounia, Western Sahara
 Libourne, France
 Rancagua, Chile
 La Rioja, Argentina

Lora del Río
 Zoersel, Belgium

M
Madrid

 Abu Dhabi, United Arab Emirates
 Asunción, Paraguay
 Bogotá, Colombia
 Bordeaux, France
 Buenos Aires, Argentina
 Caracas, Venezuela
 Guatemala City, Guatemala
 Havana, Cuba
 Lima, Peru
 Lisbon, Portugal
 Malabo, Equatorial Guinea
 Managua, Nicaragua
 Manila, Philippines
 Mexico City, Mexico
 Miami, United States
 Montevideo, Uruguay
 New York City, United States
 Nouakchott, Mauritania
 Panama City, Panama
 La Paz, Bolivia
 Quito, Ecuador
 Rabat, Morocco
 Rio de Janeiro, Brazil
 San José, Costa Rica
 San Juan, Puerto Rico
 San Salvador, El Salvador
 Santiago, Chile
 Santo Domingo, Dominican Republic
 Sarajevo, Bosnia and Herzegovina
 Tegucigalpa, Honduras
 Tripoli, Libya

Madridejos
 Nérac, France

Mairena del Aljarafe

 Montignac, France
 Ticuantepe, Nicaragua

Majadahonda
 Clamart, France

Málaga

 Passau, Germany
 Popayán, Colombia
 Zacatecas, Mexico

Malgrat de Mar

 Cárdenas, Nicaragua
 Figline e Incisa Valdarno, Italy
 Moguer, Spain
 Seynod (Annecy), France

Marbella

 Baler, Philippines
 Batumi, Georgia
 Doha, Qatar
 Itanhaém, Brazil
 Jeddah, Saudi Arabia
 Kure, Japan
 Miami Beach, United States
 Nabeul, Tunisia
 Punta del Este, Uruguay
 Solidaridad, Mexico

Marchena
 Châteaudun, France

Mataró

 Cehegín, Spain
 Corsico, Italy
 Créteil, France
 Dürnau, Germany
 Fort Lauderdale, United States
 Gammelshausen, Germany

Mieres

 Amgala, Western Sahara
 Herstal, Belgium

 San Miguel del Padrón (Havana), Cuba

Mojácar
 Encamp, Andorra

Molins de Rei

 Chinandega, Nicaragua
 Lorca, Spain

Mollet del Vallès

 Montélimar, France
 Ravensburg, Germany
 Rivoli, Italy
 San Juan de Cinco Pinos, Nicaragua

Montcada i Reixac

 Águilas, Spain
 Nahulingo, El Salvador
 La Paz Centro, Nicaragua

Montornès del Vallès

 Amgala, Western Sahara
 Villanueva, Nicaragua

Murcia

 Genoa, Italy
 Grasse, France
 Irapuato, Mexico
 Lecce, Italy
 Łódź, Poland
 Miami, United States
 Murcia, Philippines

N
Navalcarnero

 Segovia, Spain
 Vaux-le-Pénil, France

Novelda

 Bir Lehlou, Western Sahara
 Camagüey, Cuba

O
Olesa de Montserrat

 Nonantola, Italy
 Weingarten, Germany

Oñati

 Châteaubernard, France
 Gleibat El Foula, Western Sahara
 Guadalajara, Mexico
 José C. Paz, Argentina
 Zacatecas, Mexico

Oviedo

 Bochum, Germany
 Buenos Aires, Argentina
 Clermont-Ferrand, France
 Hangzhou, China

 Jersey City, United States
 Maranello, Italy
 Móstoles, Spain
 Santa Clara, Cuba
 Santiago de Compostela, Spain
 Sintra, Portugal
 Tampa, United States
 Torrevieja, Spain
 Valencia de Don Juan, Spain
 Valparaíso, Chile
 Veracruz, Mexico

 Zamora, Spain

Ourense

 Plaza de la Revolución (Havana), Cuba
 Quimper, France
 Tlalnepantla de Baz, Mexico
 Vila Real, Portugal

P
Palma de Mallorca

 Alghero, Italy
 Bari, Italy
 Naples, Italy

Las Palmas de Gran Canaria

 Garachico, Spain
 Nouadhibou, Mauritania
 San Antonio, United States
 Vigo, Spain

Pamplona

 Bayonne, France
 Paderborn, Germany
 Pamplona, Colombia
 Yamaguchi, Japan

Peñarroya-Pueblonuevo
 Vilvoorde, Belgium

Plasencia

 Cuenca, Spain
 Piacenza, Italy

Pontevedra

 Barcelos, Portugal

 Nafpaktos, Greece
 Salvador, Brazil
 San José, Costa Rica
 Santo Domingo, Dominican Republic
 Vila Nova de Cerveira, Portugal

Pozuelo de Alarcón

 Bir Lehlou, Western Sahara
 Issy-les-Moulineaux, France
 Naucalpan de Juárez, Mexico
 Poznań, Poland
 Recanati, Italy
 Xicheng (Beijing), China

R
Redondela
 Monção, Portugal

Reus

 Amgala, Western Sahara
 Astorga, Spain
 Bahía Blanca, Argentina
 Boyeros (Havana), Cuba
 Gandia, Spain
 Hadžići, Bosnia and Herzegovina

La Rinconada

 Ain Beida, Western Sahara
 Santiago de las Vegas (Havana), Cuba

Rubí

 Boyeros (Havana), Cuba
 La Calahorra, Spain
 Celanova, Spain
 Clichy, France
 Els Guiamets, Spain
 Guelta Zemmur, Western Sahara
 Ocotal, Nicaragua
 Pudahuel, Chile
 Villanueva de Córdoba, Spain

S
Sabadell

 El Argoub, Western Sahara
 Lianyungang, China
 Matagalpa, Nicaragua

Sagunto

 Cecina, Italy
 Millau, France

Salamanca

 Coimbra, Portugal
 Würzburg, Germany

Salt

 Lingen, Germany
 Quilalí, Nicaragua

San Fernando
 Montigny-le-Bretonneux, France

San Lorenzo de El Escorial
 Saint-Quentin, France

San Mateo de Gállego
 Sinzing, Germany

San Sebastián

 Cape Bojador, Western Sahara
 Marugame, Japan
 Plymouth, England, United Kingdom
 Reno, United States
 Trento, Italy
 Wiesbaden, Germany

San Sebastián de los Reyes
 Baunatal, Germany

Sant Boi de Llobregat

 Azuaga, Spain
 Coín, Spain
 Marianao (Havana), Cuba
 Nizhny Novgorod, Russia
 Peraleda del Zaucejo, Spain
 San Miguelito, Nicaragua

Sant Cugat del Vallès

 Alba, Italy
 El Argoub, Western Sahara
 La Haba, Spain

Sant Feliu de Guíxols

 Bourg-de-Péage, France
 East Grinstead, England, United Kingdom
 Mindelheim, Germany
 Schwaz, Austria
 Verbania, Italy

Sant Pere de Ribes
 Puerto Cabezas, Nicaragua

Sant Sadurní d'Anoia

 Bastia Umbra, Italy
 Cañete la Real, Spain
 Zegama, Spain

Santa Coloma de Gramenet

 Edchera, Western Sahara
 Habana del Este (Havana), Cuba
 Jalapa, Nicaragua
 Villa El Salvador, Peru

Santa Cruz de Bezana
 Martignas-sur-Jalle, France

Santa Cruz de Tenerife

 Aranda de Duero, Spain
 Cádiz, Spain
 Caracas, Venezuela
 Guatemala City, Guatemala
 Nice, France
 Rio de Janeiro, Brazil
 San Antonio, United States
 Santa Cruz de la Sierra, Bolivia
 Santa Cruz del Norte, Cuba

Santa Fe

 Ambato, Ecuador
 Baiona, Spain
 Briviesca, Spain
 Bogotá, Colombia
 Caguas, Puerto Rico
 Guanajuato, Mexico
 Magdalena del Mar, Peru
 Ocotal, Nicaragua
 Palos de la Frontera, Spain
 Playa (Havana), Cuba
 Quetzaltenango, Guatemala
 San Miguel de Allende, Mexico
 Santa Cruz, Costa Rica
 Santa Fe, Argentina
 Santa Fe, United States
 Santa Fe de Sorte, Venezuela
 Valparaíso, Chile
 Vila do Bispo, Portugal
 Vire-Normandie, France

Santa Lucía de Tirajana
 Luleå, Sweden

Santa María de Cayón
 Gujan-Mestras, France

Santiponce
 Adamclisi, Romania

Santo Domingo de la Calzada
 Winnenden, Germany

Segovia

 Gangdong (Seoul), South Korea
 Navalcarnero, Spain
 Pleven, Bulgaria
 San Bartolomé de Tirajana, Spain
 Tours, France

Sevilla la Nueva
 Saint-Ciers-sur-Gironde, France

Seville

 Antalya, Turkey
 Buenos Aires, Argentina
 Cartagena, Colombia
 Columbus, United States
 Coral Gables, United States
 Guadalajara, Mexico
 Havana, Cuba
 Kansas City, United States
 Laredo, Spain
 Medina de Rioseco, Spain
 Rostov-on-Don, Russia
 San Salvador, El Salvador
 Tlalnepantla de Baz, Mexico
 Veracruz, Mexico

Soria
 Collioure, France

T
Talavera de la Reina

 Bron, France
 Faenza, Italy
 Puebla, Mexico
 La Serena, Chile

Tarragona

 Alghero, Italy
 Avignon, France
 Klagenfurt, Austria
 Orléans, France
 Pompei, Italy
 Stafford, England, United Kingdom

Terrassa

 Granada, Nicaragua

 Pamiers, France
 Tecoluca, El Salvador
 Tétouan, Morocco

Tocina
 Żejtun, Malta

Toledo

 Aachen, Germany
 Agen, France
 Corpus Christi, United States
 Damascus, Syria
 Guanajuato, Mexico
 Heraklion, Greece
 Nara, Japan
 Old Havana (Havana), Cuba
 Safed, Israel
 Toledo, United States
 Veliko Tarnovo, Bulgaria

Tolosa

 Charleville-Mézières, France
 Zacatecas, Mexico

Tordesillas
 Setúbal, Portugal

Torrelavega

 Louga, Senegal
 Old Havana (Havana), Cuba
 Rochefort, France
 Zug, Western Sahara

Las Torres de Cotillas
 Arganil, Portugal

Torroella de Montgrí

 San Juan del Sur, Nicaragua
 Torreilles, France

Tortosa

 Alcañiz, Spain
 Avignon, France
 Le Puy-en-Velay, France
 Tartus, Syria
 Vercelli, Italy

Totana

 Kalocsa, Hungary
 Mérida, Spain
 Uchaud, France

Trujillo

 Almagro, Spain
 Batalha, Portugal
 Castegnato, Italy
 Piura, Peru
 Santa Fe de Antioquia, Colombia
 Trujillo, Honduras
 Trujillo, Peru

Tudela

 Mauléon-Licharre, France
 Mont-de-Marsan, France

U
Urretxu
 Schwarzenbruck, Germany

Utiel
 Pertuis, France

V
Valdepeñas
 Cognac, France

Valencia

 Bologna, Italy

 Guangzhou, China
 Mainz, Germany

 Valencia, Venezuela
 Veracruz, Mexico
 Xi'an, China

Valencina de la Concepción
 Vauvert, France

Valladolid

 Florence, Italy
 Lecce, Italy
 Lille, France
 Morelia, Mexico
 Orlando, United States

Vigo

 Buenos Aires, Argentina
 Caracas, Venezuela
 Celaya, Mexico
 Lorient, France
 Narsaq, Greenland
 Las Palmas de Gran Canaria, Spain
 Porto, Portugal
 Qingdao, China
 Victoria de Durango, Mexico

Viladecans
 Saint-Herblain, France

Vilafranca del Penedès

 Bühl, Germany
 Melzo, Italy
 Novo Mesto, Slovenia
 Puerto Cabezas, Nicaragua

Vilagarcía de Arousa
 Matosinhos, Portugal

Villanueva del Pardillo

 Chions, Italy
 Luisant, France

Villarreal
 Michalovce, Slovakia

Vitoria-Gasteiz

 Anaheim, United States
 Angoulême, France
 Asunción, Paraguay
 Cogo, Equatorial Guinea
 La Güera, Western Sahara
 Ibagué, Colombia

 Victoria, United States

X
Xeraco
 Bruguières, France

Y
Yepes
 Sainte-Eulalie, France

Z
Zafra
 Rambouillet, France

Zaragoza

 Atizapán de Zaragoza, Mexico
 Bethlehem, Palestine
 Biarritz, France
 Campinas, Brazil
 Canfranc, Spain
 Coimbra, Portugal
 León, Nicaragua
 Mdina, Malta
 Móstoles, Spain
 Pau, France
 La Paz, Bolivia
 La Plata, Argentina
 Ponce, Puerto Rico
 San José de Cúcuta, Colombia
 Skopje, North Macedonia
 Taizhou, China
 Tijuana, Mexico
 Yoro, Honduras
 Zamboanga City, Philippines
 Zaragoza, El Salvador
 Zaragoza, Guatemala

References

Spain
Spain geography-related lists
Populated places in Spain
Foreign relations of Spain
Municipalities of Spain